Burke Ministry can refer to one of two Ministries of sub-national governments in Australia:

 Burke Ministry (Western Australia), led by Labor Premier Brian Burke in Western Australia from 25 February 1983 until 25 February 1988
 Burke Ministry (Northern Territory), led by Country Liberal Chief Minister Denis Burke in the Northern Territory from 9 February 1999 until 26 August 2001